Kapellskär is a port about  north of Stockholm, in Sweden. It is located by the Baltic Sea, in Norrtälje Municipality, Stockholm County.

Services
The port is served by frequent passenger ferry services to Mariehamn, Åland, Finland, operated by Viking Line, with three services per day and direction during peak season. There are also services to Naantali in mainland Finland operated by Finnlink, and to Paldiski in Estonia operated by Tallink and DFDS, although only the Mariehamn route is open to pedestrians: the Naantali and DFDS Paldiski routes require a vehicle.

References

External links 

Ports of Stockholm
DFDS

Water transport in Sweden
Buildings and structures in Stockholm County
Port cities and towns of the Baltic Sea
Geography of Stockholm County